Johannes Secundus (also Janus Secundus) (15 November 1511 – 25 September 1536) was a New Latin poet of Dutch nationality.

Early life and education 

Born Jan Everaerts in The Hague, his father Nicolaes Everaerts was a well known jurist and friend of Erasmus.

In 1528 his family moved to Mechlin, where Secundus wrote his first book of elegies. In 1532 he went to Bourges with his brother Marius to study law under Alciati. He obtained his licentia.

Career 

In 1533 he went to join his other brother Grudius at the Spanish court of Charles V. There he spent two years working as secretary to the Archbishop of Toledo. He returned to Mechlin because of illness, and died at Saint-Amand in September 1536 at the age of twenty-four.

Writings 

Secundus was a prolific writer, and in his short life he produced several books of elegies on his lovers Julia and Neaera, epigrams, odes, verse epistles and epithalamia, as well as some prose writings (epistles and itineraria).

His most famous work, though, was the Liber Basiorum (Book of Kisses, first complete edition 1541), a short collection consisting of nineteen poems in various metres, in which the poet explores the theme of the kiss in relation to his Spanish lover, Neaera. The 'Basia' are really extended imitations of Catullus (in particular poems 5 and 7) and some poems from the Anthologia Graeca; Secundus situates his poetry, stylistically as well as thematically, firmly with the Neo-Catullan tradition. Variations on the central theme include: imagery of natural fertility; the 'arithmetic' of kissing; kisses as nourishment or cure; kisses that wound or bring death; and the exchange of souls through kissing. Secundus also introduces elements of Neo-Platonism and Petrarchism into his poems.

Musical settings and influence
His poems were later set in Dutch translation as madrigals by Cornelis Tijmensz Padbrué (1631).
Montaigne considered his Kisses the equivalent of Rabelais or The Decameron in terms of entertainment value.

See also

References

Further reading
Secundus, J. ''Oeuvres complètes, édition critique établie et annotée par Roland Guillot. Tome I Paris: Champion, 2005 (pour le tome I comme pour les suivants, il ne s'agit nullement d'une édition critique; traduction, commentaire et analyse sont extrêmement fautifs et indigents (l'édition fournit par ailleurs un grand nombre de poèmes français des imitateurs de Second). Il en va de même des Essais sur Jean Second publiés plus récemment chez Garnier, où les introductions de l'édition sont simplement reprises avec les mêmes manques et les mêmes erreurs. P. Galand).
Anne Rolet, Stéphane Rolet, "La quête d'Orphée, la naissance d'Athéna, les visions de la sophia divina : essai d'interprétation symbolique de la façade du palais de Maximilien Transsylvain à Bruxelles", Humanistica Lovaniensia, 50, 2011, pp. 161–193 [l'article porte en grande partie sur l'épigramme 1, 43 de Jean Second :In magnificas aedes quas Bruxellae struxit Maximilianus Transyluanus].
Secundus, J., Oeuvres complètes, dir. P. Galand, édition critique par W. Gelderblom (avec la collaboration de P. Tuynman), d'après le manuscrit Rawlinson G 154, Oxford, Bodleian Library, et l'édition de 1541 (Utrecht, Herman van Borculo) avec traduction, notes et études littéraires de G. A. Bergère, A. Bouscharain, K. Descoings, N. Catellani-Dufrêne, A. Laimé, P. Galand, L. Katz, S. Laburthe, S. Laigneau-Fontaine, V. Leroux, O. Pedeflous, C. Pezeret, S. Provini, A. Rolet, S. Rolet, E. Séris, A. Smeesters, L. van Kammen, à paraître à Genève, Editions Droz, 2022.
22

External links 
 Basia by Janus Secundus, at The Latin Library
 

1511 births
1536 deaths
16th-century Latin-language writers
Dutch male poets
Writers from The Hague
New Latin-language poets